Terence Robert Groom (28 November 1944 – 29 April 2021) was an Australian politician who represented the South Australian House of Assembly seats of Morphett from 1977 to 1979 and Hartley from 1982 to 1993 for the Labor Party. He served from 1991 to 1993 as an independent. Groom died on 29 April 2021.

References

Members of the South Australian House of Assembly
1944 births
2021 deaths
Independent members of the Parliament of South Australia
Australian Labor Party members of the Parliament of South Australia
People from South Australia